Hinkletown, Pennsylvania is an unincorporated community located in Earl Township in Lancaster County, Pennsylvania.  Hinkletown is located along U.S. Route 322.

References

Unincorporated communities in Lancaster County, Pennsylvania
Unincorporated communities in Pennsylvania